Daniel Lee Stevens (born February 23, 1950) is an American politician in the state of Minnesota. He served in the Minnesota State Senate.

Biography
Stevens was a member of the Minnesota Senate and represented the 17th district, which includes areas of  Benton, Kanabec, Mille Lacs, Morrison, and Sherburne counties.

An independent republican, he is currently retired and resides in Mora, Minnesota.

Personal life

Education
After graduating from high school Dan attended the University of Minnesota.

Minnesota Senate

Election
Crawford was first elected to the House in 2010 from district 8B. He defeated the incumbent, Tim Faust, by a margin of 8673 (55.92%) to 6786 (43.76%). Crawford ran on a platform of improving the Minnesota business climate, controlling spending and keeping taxes lower.

Passed Bills Authored and Co-authored

Bills Authored: 
Introduced - 02/14/2002 / Passed 04/03/2002 - Uniform municipal contracting law exemption for water storage tank service contracts; Walker Ah-Gwah-Ching water tower maintenance and operation agreement

Introduced - 02/18/2002 - Food handlers license prepared food sales exemption limits and labeling requirements modification

Bills Co-Authored: 
Introduced - 03/29/2001 / Passed 04/03/2002 - Technology circuits or systems contractors and power limited technicians

Introduced - 02/04/2002 / Passed 03/26/2002 - Veterans homes discretionary admissions means of support exclusions expansion

Introduced - 03/08/2001 / Passed 04/17/2002 - Nursing home administrators requirements modification

References

External links 

 Rep. Crawford Web Page
 Map of Minnesota  House District 8B
 Project Votesmart - Rep. Roger Crawford Profile
 Roger Crawford Campaign Web Site

Living people
Businesspeople from Minnesota
Military personnel from Minnesota
People from Mora, Minnesota
21st-century American politicians
1950 births
Republican Party Minnesota state senators